The 2006 Six Nations Championship was the seventh series of the rugby union Six Nations Championship to be held since the competition expanded in 2000 to include Italy. Including the previous incarnations as the Home Nations and Five Nations, this was the 112th series of the northern hemisphere rugby union championship. This was the fourth edition sponsored by Royal Bank of Scotland.

This was the last Six Nations to be held before the redevelopment of Lansdowne Road into today's Aviva Stadium. Ireland played their 2007, 2008, 2009 and 2010 Six Nations home fixtures at Croke Park, also in Dublin.

In this year, France won the competition on points difference over Ireland. Ireland received the consolation prize of the Triple Crown Trophy, presented for the first time that year, by winning their matches against the other Home Nations: Wales, Scotland and England. Italy once more collected the Wooden Spoon, but showed considerable improvement over past years, earning a first-ever competition point away from home in a draw against Wales. For the first time since 2000, Scotland won the Calcutta Cup.

Participants

Squads

Table

Results

Week 1 

 This was England's biggest win against Wales since 2002.

 This was Scotland's first victory against France at Murrayfield Stadium since 1996.
 This was Scotland's first victory against France since 1999.
 Scotland won their opening match for the first time in the Six Nations.
 This was Nicolas Brusque's last game for France.

Week 2 

 Ronan O'Gara becomes Ireland's all time top point scorer after converting Andrew Trimble's try.

 Steve Walsh showed Scott Murray a red card after he kicked Ian Gough in the face in a ruck. This was the first red card issued in the Six Nations since Alessandro Troncon was sent off against Ireland in 2001.
 Mike Ruddock resigned as Wales coach after this match due to a conflict with the Welsh Rugby Union.

Week 3 

 This was Scotland's first victory against England since 2000.
 Scotland won the Calcutta Cup for the first time since 2000.
 England's defeat meant no team was able to win the Grand Slam.
 Scott Murray's suspension meant he missed his first match in the Championship, bringing to an end a run of 36 consecutive appearances.

 This was Wales' biggest defeat against Ireland since 2002.

Week 4 

 Italy won their first points in an away match in the competition.
 This was the first draw in the Six Nations since Scotland and Wales drew 28–28 in 2001.

 This was Ireland's narrowest victory over Scotland since 1988.
 This was the last game ever played at Lansdowne Road in the Championship.

 This was France's biggest victory against England since 1972.
 Florian Fritz's opening try was the quickest try scored in the Six Nations.

Week 5 

 This was Scotland's highest finish in the Six Nations since 2001.

 This was France's fourth consecutive victory at the Millennium Stadium.

 This was Ireland's second win in a row at Twickenham Stadium.
 Ireland won the Triple Crown.
 Ireland needed to win by 34 points to win the Championship.

Scorers

References

 
2006 rugby union tournaments for national teams
2006
2005–06 in European rugby union
2005–06 in Irish rugby union
2005–06 in English rugby union
2005–06 in Welsh rugby union
2005–06 in Scottish rugby union
2005–06 in French rugby union
2005–06 in Italian rugby union
February 2006 sports events in Europe
March 2006 sports events in Europe